Octavio Paz Lozano (March 31, 1914 – April 19, 1998) was a Mexican poet and diplomat. For his body of work, he was awarded the 1977 Jerusalem Prize, the 1981 Miguel de Cervantes Prize, the 1982 Neustadt International Prize for Literature, and the 1990 Nobel Prize in Literature.

Early life
Octavio Paz was born near Mexico City. His family was a prominent liberal political family in Mexico, with  Spanish and indigenous Mexican roots.  With his grandfather, Ireneo Paz, the family's patriarch, having fought in the War of the Reform against conservatives, and then became a staunch supporter of liberal war hero Porfirio Díaz up until just before the 1910 outbreak of the Mexican Revolution. Ireneo Paz became an intellectual and journalist, starting several newspapers, where he was publisher and printer. Ireneo's son, Octavio Paz Solórzano, supported Emiliano Zapata during the Revolution and published an early biography of him and the Zapatista movement. Octavio was named for him, but spent considerable time with his grandfather Ireneo since his namesake father was active fighting in the Mexican Revolution. His father died in a violent fashion.  The family experienced financial ruin after the Mexican Revolution. The family briefly relocated to Los Angeles before returning to Mexico. Paz had blue eyes and was often mistaken for a foreigner by other children. According to a biography written by his long-time associate, historian Enrique Krauze, said that when Zapatista revolutionary Antonio Díaz Soto y Gama met young Octavio he said "Caramba, you didn't tell me you had a Visigoth for a son!" Krauze quotes Paz as saying "I felt myself Mexican but they wouldn't let me be one."

Paz was introduced to literature early in his life through the influence of his grandfather Ireneo's library, filled with classic Mexican and European literature. During the 1920s, he discovered Gerardo Diego, Juan Ramón Jiménez, and Antonio Machado. These Spanish writers had a great influence on his early writings.

As a teenager in 1931, Paz published his first poems, including "Cabellera". Two years later, at the age of 19, he published Luna Silvestre ("Wild Moon"), a collection of poems. In 1932, with some friends, he funded his first literary review, Barandal.

For a few years, Paz studied law and literature at National University of Mexico. During this time, he became familiar with leftist poets, such as Chilean Pablo Neruda. In 1936, Paz abandoned his law studies and left Mexico City for Yucatán to work at a school in Mérida. The school was set up for the sons of peasants and workers. There, he began working on the first of his long, ambitious poems, "Entre la piedra y la flor" ("Between the Stone and the Flower") (1941, revised in 1976). Influenced by the work of T. S. Eliot, it explores the situation of the Mexican peasant under the domineering landlords of the day.

In July 1937 he attended the Second International Writers' Congress, the purpose of which was to discuss the attitude of intellectuals to the war in Spain, held in Valencia, Barcelona and Madrid and attended by many writers including André Malraux, Ernest Hemingway, Stephen Spender, and Pablo Neruda. Paz showed his solidarity with the Republican side and against the fascists led by Francisco Franco and supported by Adolf Hitler and Benito Mussolini. He also visited Paris while in Europe. There, he encountered the surrealist movement, which left a profound impact upon him. After his return to Mexico, Paz co-funded a literary journal, Taller ("Workshop") in 1938, and wrote for the magazine until 1941. In 1937 he married Elena Garro, who is considered one of Mexico's finest writers. They had met in 1935. They had one daughter, Helena, and were divorced in 1959.

In 1943, Paz received a Guggenheim Fellowship and used it to study at the University of California at Berkeley in the United States. Two years later he entered the Mexican diplomatic service, and was assigned for a time to New York City. In 1945, he was sent to Paris, where he wrote El Laberinto de la Soledad ("The Labyrinth of Solitude"). The New York Times later described it as "an analysis of modern Mexico and the Mexican personality in which he described his fellow countrymen as instinctive nihilists who hide behind masks of solitude and ceremoniousness." In 1952, he travelled to India for the first time. That same year, he went to Tokyo, as chargé d'affaires. He next was assigned to Geneva, Switzerland. He returned to Mexico City in 1954, where he wrote his great poem "Piedra de sol" ("Sunstone") in 1957, and published Libertad bajo palabra (Liberty under Oath), a compilation of his poetry up to that time. He was sent again to Paris in 1959. In 1962, he was named Mexico's ambassador to India.

Later life
In New Delhi, as Ambassador of Mexico to India, Paz completed several works, including El mono gramático (The Monkey Grammarian) and Ladera este (Eastern Slope). While in India, he met numerous writers of a group known as the Hungry Generation and had a profound influence on them.

In 1965, he married Marie-José Tramini, a French woman who would be his wife for the rest of his life. That fall in 1965 he went to Cornell and taught two courses, one in Spanish and one in English. The magazine LIFE en Español published a piece about his stay at Cornell in their July 4, 1966 issue. There are several pictures in the article.  After this he returned to Mexico. In 1968, he resigned from the diplomatic service in protest of the Mexican government's massacre of student demonstrators in Tlatelolco.
After staying in Paris for refuge, he returned to Mexico in 1969. He founded his magazine Plural (1970–1976) with a group of liberal Mexican and Latin American writers.

From 1969 to 1970 he was Simón Bolívar Professor at Cambridge University. He was also a visiting lecturer during the late 1960s and the A. D. White Professor-at-Large from 1972 to 1974 at Cornell University. In 1974 he lectured at Harvard University as Charles Eliot Norton Lecturer. His book Los hijos del limo ("Children of the Mire") was the result of those lectures. After the Mexican government closed Plural in 1975, Paz founded Vuelta, another cultural magazine. He was editor of that until his death in 1998, when the magazine closed.

He won the 1977 Jerusalem Prize for literature on the theme of individual freedom. In 1980, he was awarded an honorary doctorate from Harvard, and in 1982, he won the Neustadt Prize. Once good friends with novelist Carlos Fuentes, Paz became estranged from him in the 1980s in a disagreement over the Sandinistas, whom Paz opposed and Fuentes supported. In 1988, Paz's magazine Vuelta published criticism of Fuentes by Enrique Krauze, resulting in estrangement between Paz and Fuentes, who had long been friends.

A collection of Paz's poems (written between 1957 and 1987) was published in 1990. In 1990, he was awarded the Nobel Prize for Literature.

He died of cancer on April 19, 1998, in Mexico City.

Guillermo Sheridan, who was named by Paz as director of the Octavio Paz Foundation in 1998, published a book, Poeta con paisaje (2004) with several biographical essays about the poet's life up to 1998, when he died.

Aesthetics
"The poetry of Octavio Paz", wrote the critic Ramón Xirau, "does not hesitate between language and silence; it leads into the realm of silence where true language lives."

Writings
A prolific author and poet, Paz published scores of works during his lifetime, many of which have been translated into other languages. His poetry has been translated into English by Samuel Beckett, Charles Tomlinson, Elizabeth Bishop, Muriel Rukeyser and Mark Strand. His early poetry was influenced by Marxism, surrealism, and existentialism, as well as religions such as Buddhism and Hinduism. His poem, "Piedra de sol" ("Sunstone"), written in 1957, was praised as a "magnificent" example of surrealist poetry in the presentation speech of his Nobel Prize.

His later poetry dealt with love and eroticism, the nature of time, and Buddhism. He also wrote poetry about his other passion, modern painting, dedicating poems to the work of Balthus, Joan Miró, Marcel Duchamp, Antoni Tàpies, Robert Rauschenberg, and Roberto Matta. As an essayist Paz wrote on topics such as Mexican politics and economics, Aztec art, anthropology, and sexuality. His book-length essay, The Labyrinth of Solitude (Spanish: El laberinto de la soledad), delves into the minds of his countrymen, describing them as hidden behind masks of solitude. Due to their history, their identity is lost between a pre-Columbian and a Spanish culture, negating either. A key work in understanding Mexican culture, it greatly influenced other Mexican writers, such as Carlos Fuentes. Ilan Stavans wrote that he was "the quintessential surveyor, a Dante's Virgil, a Renaissance man".

Paz wrote the play La hija de Rappaccini in 1956. The plot centers around a young Italian student who wanders about Professor Rappaccini's beautiful gardens where he spies the professor's daughter Beatrice. He is horrified to discover the poisonous nature of the garden's beauty. Paz adapted the play from an 1844 short story by American writer Nathaniel Hawthorne, which was also entitled "Rappaccini's Daughter". He combined Hawthorne's story with sources from the Indian poet Vishakadatta and influences from Japanese Noh theatre, Spanish autos sacramentales, and the poetry of William Butler Yeats. The play's opening performance was designed by the Mexican painter Leonora Carrington. In 1972, Surrealist author André Pieyre de Mandiargues translated the play into French as La fille de Rappaccini  (Editions Mercure de France). First performed in English in 1996 at the Gate Theatre in London, the play was translated and directed by Sebastian Doggart and starred Sarah Alexander as Beatrice. The Mexican composer Daniel Catán adapted the play as an opera in 1992.

Paz's other works translated into English include several volumes of essays, some of the more prominent of which are Alternating Current (tr. 1973), Configurations (tr. 1971), in the UNESCO Collection of Representative Works, The Labyrinth of Solitude (tr. 1963), The Other Mexico (tr. 1972); and El Arco y la Lira (1956; tr. The Bow and the Lyre, 1973). In the United States, Helen Lane's translation of Alternating Current won a National Book Award.
Along with these are volumes of critical studies and biographies, including of Claude Lévi-Strauss and Marcel Duchamp (both, tr. 1970), and The Traps of Faith, an analytical biography of Sor Juana Inés de la Cruz, the Mexican 17th-century nun, feminist poet, mathematician, and thinker.

His works include the poetry collections ¿Águila o sol? (1951), La Estación Violenta, (1956), Piedra de Sol (1957). In English, Early Poems: 1935–1955 (tr. 1974) and Collected Poems, 1957–1987 (1987) have been edited and translated by Eliot Weinberger, who is Paz's principal translator into American English.

Political thought

Originally, Paz supported the Republicans during the Spanish Civil War, but after learning of the murder of one of his friends by the Stalinist secret police, he became gradually disillusioned. While in Paris in the early 1950s, influenced by David Rousset, André Breton and Albert Camus, he started publishing his critical views on totalitarianism in general, and particularly against Joseph Stalin, leader of the Soviet Union.

In his magazines Plural and Vuelta, Paz exposed the violations of human rights in communist regimes, including Castro's Cuba. This brought him much animosity from sectors of the Latin American left. In the prologue to Volume IX of his complete works, Paz stated that from the time when he abandoned communist dogma, the mistrust of many in the Mexican intelligentsia started to transform into an intense and open enmity. Paz continued to consider himself a man of the left, the democratic, "liberal" left, not the dogmatic and illiberal one. He also criticized the Mexican government and leading party that dominated the nation for most of the 20th century.

Politically, Paz was a social democrat, who became increasingly supportive of liberal ideas without ever renouncing to his initial leftist and romantic views. In fact, Paz was "very slippery for anyone thinking in rigid ideological categories," Yvon Grenier wrote in his book on Paz's political thought. "Paz was simultaneously a romantic who spurned materialism and reason, a liberal who championed freedom and democracy, a conservative who respected tradition, and a socialist who lamented the withering of fraternity and equality. An advocate of fundamental transformation in the way we see ourselves and modern society, Paz was also a promoter of incremental change, not revolution."

In 1990, during the aftermath of the fall of the Berlin wall, Paz and his Vuelta colleagues invited several of the world's writers and intellectuals to Mexico City to discuss the collapse of communism. Writers included Czesław Miłosz, Hugh Thomas, Daniel Bell, Ágnes Heller, Cornelius Castoriadis, Hugh Trevor-Roper, Jean-François Revel, Michael Ignatieff, Mario Vargas Llosa, Jorge Edwards and Carlos Franqui. The encounter was called The experience of freedom (Spanish: La experiencia de la libertad) and broadcast on Mexican television from 27 August to 2 September.

Paz criticized the Zapatista uprising in 1994. He spoke broadly in favor of a "military solution" to the uprising of January 1994, and hoped that the "army would soon restore order in the region". With respect to President Zedillo's offensive in February 1995, he signed an open letter that described the offensive as a "legitimate government action" to reestablish the "sovereignty of the nation" and to bring "Chiapas peace and Mexicans tranquility".

First literary experiences 
Paz was dazzled by The Waste Land by T. S. Eliot, in Enrique Munguia's translation as El Páramo which was published in the magazine Contemporaries in 1930. As a result of this, although he maintained his primary interest in poetry, he had an unavoidable outlook on prose: "Literally, this dual practice was for me a game of reflections between poetry and prose".

Worried about confirming the existence of a link between morals and poetry, in 1931, at the age of 16, he wrote what would be his first published article, "Ethics of the Artist", where he planted the question about the duty of an artist among what would be deemed art of thesis, or pure art, which disqualifies the second as a result of the teaching of tradition. Assimilating a language that resembles a religious style and, paradoxically, a Marxist style, finds the true value of art in its purpose and meaning, for which, the followers of pure art, of which he's not one, are found in an isolated position and favor the Kantian idea of the "man that loses all relation with the world".

The magazine Barandal appeared in August 1931, put together by Rafael López Malo, Salvador Toscano, Arnulfo Martínez Lavalle and Octavio Paz. All of them were not yet in their youth except for Salvador Toscano, who was a renowned writer thanks to his parents. Rafael López participated in the magazine, "Modern" and, as well as Miguel D. Martínez Rendón, in the movimiento de los agoristas, although it was more commented on and known by the high school students, over all for his poem, "The Golden Beast". Octavio Paz Solórzano became known in his circle as the occasional author of literary narratives that appeared in the Sunday newspaper add-in El Universal, as well as Ireneo Paz which was the name that gave a street in Mixcoac identity.

Awards
 Inducted Member of Colegio Nacional, Mexican highly selective academy of arts and sciences 1967
 Peace Prize of the German Book Trade
 National Prize for Arts and Sciences (Mexico) in Literature 1977
 Honorary Doctorate National Autonomous University of Mexico 1978
 Honorary Doctorate (Harvard University) 1980
 Ollin Yoliztli Prize 1980
 Miguel de Cervantes Prize 1981
 Nobel Literature Prize in 1990
 Grand Officer of the Order of Merit of the Italian Republic 1991
 Premio Mondello (Palermo, Italy)
 Alfonso Reyes International Prize
 Neustadt International Prize for Literature 1982
 Jerusalem Prize
 Menéndez Pelayo International Prize
 Alexis de Tocqueville Prize
 Xavier Villaurrutia Award

List of works

Poetry collections
 1933: Luna silvestre
 1936: No pasarán!
 1937: Raíz del hombre
 1937: Bajo tu clara sombra y otros poemas sobre España
 1941: Entre la piedra y la flor
 1942: A la orilla del mundo, compilation
 1949: Libertad bajo palabra
 1954: Semillas para un himno
 1957: Piedra de Sol (Sunstone)
 1958: La estación violenta
 1962: Salamandra (1958–1961)
 1965: Viento entero
 1967: Blanco
 1968: Discos visuales
 1969: Ladera Este (1962–1968)
 1969: La centena (1935–1968)
 1971: Topoemas
 1972: Renga: A Chain of Poems with Jacques Roubaud, Edoardo Sanguineti and Charles Tomlinson
 1974: El mono gramático
 1975: Pasado en claro
 1976: Vuelta
 1979: Hijos del aire/Airborn with Charles Tomlinson
 1979: Poemas (1935–1975)
 1985: Prueba del nueve
 1987:  Árbol adentro (1976–1987)
 1989: El fuego de cada día, selection, preface and notes by Paz

Anthology
 1966: Poesía en movimiento (México: 1915–1966), edition by Octavio Paz, Alí Chumacero, Homero Aridjis and Jose Emilio Pacheco

Essays and Analysis
 1950: El laberinto de la soledad: Vida y pensamiento de México (Published in English in 1961 as The Labyrinth of Solitude: Life and Thought in Mexico)
 1970: Posdata (Published in English in 1972 as The Other Mexico: Critique of the Pyramid)
 1993: La Llama Doble, Amor y Erotismo

Translations by Octavio Paz
 1957: Sendas de Oku, by Matsuo Bashō, translated in collaboration with Eikichi Hayashiya
 1962: Antología, by Fernando Pessoa
 1974: Versiones y diversiones (Collection of his translations of a number of authors into Spanish)

Translations of his works
 1952: Anthologie de la poésie mexicaine, edition and introduction by Octavio Paz; translated into French by Guy Lévis-Mano
 1958: Anthology of Mexican Poetry, edition and introduction by Octavio Paz; translated into English by Samuel Beckett
 1971: Configurations, translated by G. Aroul (and others)
 1974: The Monkey Grammarian (El mono gramático); translated into English by Helen Lane)
 1995: The Double Flame (La Llama Double, Amor y Erotismo); translated by Helen Lane

Notes

 Hernández, Consuelo. "The Poetry of Octavio Paz". Library of Congress, 2008. https://www.loc.gov/item/webcast-4329/

References

External links

 Zona Octavio Paz
 Nobel museum biography and list of works
 Boletin Octavio Paz
 "Octavio Paz" The Art of Poetry No. 42 Summer 1991 The Paris Review
  including the Nobel Lecture, December 8, 1990 In Search of the Present Recorded in Washington D.C. on October 18, 1988. Video (1 Hr)
 
 Consuelo Hernández, Enrico Santí on Octavio Paz. Recorded at the Library of Congress for the Hispanic Division’s video literary archive. 2005
 Review of Octavio Paz: El poeta y la revolución, Enrique Krauze, Mexican Studies/Estudios mexicanos'' (2015), 31 (1): 196–200.
 Octavio Paz Corral recorded at the Library of Congress for the Hispanic Division’s audio literary archive on March 23–24, 1961

 
1914 births
1998 deaths
20th-century Mexican poets
20th-century male writers
20th-century translators
Ambassadors of Mexico to India
English–Spanish translators
French–Spanish translators
Portuguese–Spanish translators
Jerusalem Prize recipients
Mestizo writers
Mexican essayists
Mexican literary critics
Mexican Nobel laureates
Mexican male poets
Mexican translators
Mexican editors
Mexican diplomats
Members of El Colegio Nacional (Mexico)
National Autonomous University of Mexico alumni
University of California, Berkeley alumni
Nobel laureates in Literature
Premio Cervantes winners
National Prize for Arts and Sciences (Mexico)
Poets from Mexico City
Writers from Mexico City
20th-century essayists
20th-century Mexican philosophers
Mexican magazine founders
Male essayists
Translators of Fernando Pessoa
Surrealist poets
Poet-diplomats